Nine French Formula One engine manufacturers have produced engines either for their own cars or those of other Formula One constructors. Bugatti, Gordini, Matra, Peugeot, Renault and Talbot have designed and produced engines. Renault engines are associated with 12 World Constructors' Championship titles and 11 World Drivers' Championship titles.

All engine manufacturers have followed the regulations of Formula One enacted by the Fédération Internationale de l'Automobile (FIA).

Alphabetical list of French Formula One engine manufacturers

Bugatti
Molsheim-based Bugatti, which competed in Grand Prix racing before the Second World War, created a Formula One engine for its T251. It was designed by Gioacchino Colombo and took part in only one race in 1956.

CTA-Arsenal
CTA designed an engine for its racing car in 1946. Designed by Albert Lory and manufactured in Châtillon-sous-Bagneux, it only competed in two races, in 1947 and 1949. The project was abandoned before the creation of the Drivers' World Championship in 1950.

Gordini
Amédée Gordini has designed several F1 engines for French automobile manufacturer Simca and for his own company. Simca took part in 14 Grands Prix, from 1951 to 1953, and Gordini took part in 33, from 1952 to 1956.

Matra Sports

Matra Sports supplied V12 engines to Formula One Matra from 1968 to 1972, Shadow in 1975, and Ligier from 1976 to 1978 and 1981 and 1982. These engines were designed by Georges Martin.

Mecachrome
Mecachrome manufactured engines designed by Renault (RS9) from 1998 to 2000. They were rebadged as Playlife for Benetton, and rebadged as Supertec for Williams and BAR.
GC3701-RS09 (1998): V10, 3.0 L, 775 hp @ 17,000 rpm.

Peugeot

Peugeot Sport supplied V10 engines to a few Formula One teams: McLaren in 1994, Jordan from 1995 to 1997, and Prost from 1998 to 2000.

Renault

Renault engines equipped Renault's F1 cars from 1977 to 1985, from 2002 to 2011, and 2016 to the present day.

They have also supplied other teams:

Team Lotus (1983–1986)
Équipe Ligier (1984–1986, 1990, 1992–1994)
Tyrrell Racing (1985–1986)
Williams Grand Prix Engineering (1990–1997, 2012–2013)
Benetton Formula (1995–1997, 2001)
Red Bull Racing (2007–2015)
Caterham F1 (2011–2014)
Lotus F1 (2012–2014)
Scuderia Toro Rosso (2014–2015, 2017)
McLaren F1 Team (2018-2020)
Alpine F1 Team (2021)

Turbocharged V6 engines

Naturally-aspirated V10 engines

Naturally-aspirated V8 engines

Turbocharged V6 engines with ERS

Supertec
Supertec supplied Renault-designed, Mecachrome-built 1998 season engines updated for 1999 and 2000. Founded by Flavio Briatore, the company supplied Williams, Benetton and BAR in 1999, and Benetton and Arrows in 2000, with Mecachrome engines.

Talbot
Talbot made two engines for Talbot-Darracq and Talbot-Lago Formula One cars.

References

Further reading
 Luc Melua : « Compresseurs et turbos, la suralimentation », Editions EPA, Paris, 1985. 
Leo Turrini & Daniele Amaduzzi  :   « F1 91 », Vallardi & Associat Editeur (Milano) 1991.
Luc Domenjoz, Steve Domenjoz & Domonique Leroy : « L’année 1993 Formule 1 »,  préface Jean Alesi, Chronosports Editeur (Lausanne), 1993 ?
« 1999 Formula 1 Yearbook », version française « 99 Formule 1 », préface Jacques Laffite, TF1 Editions (Paris), 1999.
 French magazine Sport Auto collection.

Engines
Automobile engines
 
Formula One